Elijah Interfaith Institute is a nonprofit, international, UNESCO-sponsored interfaith organization  founded by Alon Goshen-Gottstein in 1997.The organization is headquartered in Jerusalem, with offices and representatives in different countries,

Elijah Board of World Religious Leaders 
The Elijah Board of World Religious Leaders brings together religious figures from Judaism, Islam, Christianity, Buddhism and the Religions of India in order to provide a platform for the exchange of ideas. The Board numbers about 70 leaders from all faith traditions, and includes figures such as the Dalai Lama, Cardinal Schönborn, Mustafa Cerić, Mata Amritanandamayi and Chief Rabbi Jonathan Sacks. The Board represents an opportunity for these religious leaders to collectively address today's problems from within the resources of their own traditions. The Elijah Board of World Religious Leaders convenes in-person bi-annually, in different locations around the globe. It has met to date seven times, since its creation in Seville in 2003. Sub-groups have met on specific projects of common interest.

Elijah Interfaith Academy
The projects undertaken by the Academy deal with religion in contemporary society, and with the theoretical foundations of interfaith relations. Several research projects and publications have focused on theology of religions, considering the theological approaches of a given religion towards others as well of broader theoretical issues related to religious pluralism. One scholarly forum of the Elijah Interfaith Academy is devoted to the study of the mystical and spiritual life in an interreligious context. One of the contemporary research projects focuses on the study of outstanding religious individuals who have the potential of being inspiring across religious traditions.

Elijah School for the Study of Wisdom in World Religions  

Prior to the creation of the Board and Academy, Elijah was known as the Elijah School for the Study of Wisdom in World Religions. Not only did the school bring together twelve Jerusalem-based Jewish, Christian, and Muslim institutions within an academic consortium, but it also provided one of the few places in Israel where Orthodox, Conservative and Reform Jews met without prejudice. An Elijah Summer School consists of academic study, which takes place not in isolation or in abstraction, but within an interfaith community of faculty and students. Interfaith dialogue forms the backbone of the school and allows for the integration of the study of religious traditions with exposure to their lived spirituality.

Topics of Elijah Interfaith Summer Schools:

 The Place of Law in World Religions
 The Representation of God in Image, Icon, Word, and Thought
 Mystical Prayer
 Conversion and Religious Identity
 Holy Lives: Saints in World Religions
 Sacred Space without Holy Land: Diaspora in World Religion
 Authority in World Religions
 Death and Dying
 Holiness in World Religions: The Idea and the Crisis
 Sexuality, Textuality, and Spirituality
 The Power of Prayer
 Religious Genius
 Religious Leadership: Ideals and Challenges

References 

Interfaith organizations
Organizations based in Jerusalem
1997 establishments in Israel
Religious organizations established in 1997